Baskeleh-ye Boruvim (also Romanized as Baskeleh-ye Borūvīm; also known as Baskeleh, Baskeleh-ye Būrīm, and Borūvīm Bāskeleh-ye Amīn) is a village in Gowavar Rural District, Govar District, Gilan-e Gharb County, Kermanshah Province, Iran. At the 2006 census, its population was 209, in 38 families.

References 

Populated places in Gilan-e Gharb County